A light fixture (US English), light fitting (UK English), or luminaire is an electrical device containing an electric lamp that provides illumination. All light fixtures have a fixture body and one or more lamps. The lamps may be in sockets for easy replacement—or, in the case of some LED fixtures, hard-wired in place.

Fixtures may also have a switch to control the light, either attached to the lamp body or attached to the power cable. Permanent light fixtures, such as dining room chandeliers, may have no switch on the fixture itself, but rely on a wall switch.

Fixtures require an electrical connection to a power source, typically AC mains power, but some run on battery power for camping or emergency lights. Permanent lighting fixtures are directly wired. Movable lamps have a plug and cord that plugs into a wall socket.

Light fixtures may also have other features, such as reflectors for directing the light, an aperture (with or without a lens), an outer shell or housing for lamp alignment and protection, an electrical ballast or power supply, and a shade to diffuse the light or direct it towards a workspace (e.g., a desk lamp). A wide variety of special light fixtures are created for use in the automotive lighting industry, aerospace, marine and medicine sectors.

Portable light fixtures are often called lamps, as in table lamp or desk lamp.  In technical terminology, the lamp is the light source, which, in casual terminology, is called the light bulb. Both the International Electrotechnical Commission (IEC) and the Illuminating Engineering Society (IES) recommend the term luminaire for technical use.

History
Fixture manufacturing began soon after production of the incandescent light bulb.  When practical uses of fluorescent lighting were realized after 1924, the three leading companies to produce various fixtures were Lightolier, Artcraft Fluorescent Lighting Corporation, and Globe Lighting in the United States.

Fixture types
Light fixtures are classified by how the fixture is installed, the light function or lamp type.

Free-standing or portable
 Table lamp fixtures, standard lamp fixtures, and office task light luminaires.
 Balanced-arm lamp is a spot light with an adjustable arm such as anglepoise, RAMUN or Luxo L1.
 Gooseneck (fixture)
 Nightlight
 Floor Lamp
 Torch lamp or torchières are floor lamps with an upward-facing shade. They provide general lighting to the rest of the room.
 Gooseneck lamp
  Bouillotte lamp: see Bouillotte

Fixed
 Ceiling Dome – the light source(s) are hidden behind a translucent dome typically made of glass, with some combination of frosting and surface texturing to diffuse the light. These can be flush-mount fixtures mounted into the ceiling, or semi-flush fixtures separated by a small distance (usually about 3–12"). 
 Open ceiling dome – the translucent dome is suspended a short distance below the ceiling by a mechanism that is hidden with the exception of a screw-knob or other device appearing on the outer dome face, and pulling this knob releases the dome.
 Enclosed ceiling dome – the translucent dome mates with a ring that is mounted flush with the ceiling.
 Recessed light – the protective housing is concealed behind a ceiling or wall, leaving only the fixture itself exposed. The ceiling-mounted version is often called a downlight.
 "Cans" with a variety of lamps – this term is jargon for inexpensive downlighting products that are recessed into the ceiling, or sometimes for uplights placed on the floor.  The name comes from the shape of the housing.  The term "pot lights" is often used in Canada and parts of the US.
 Cove light – indirect lighting recessed into the ceiling in a long box against a wall.
 Troffer – recessed fluorescent light fixtures, usually rectangular in shape to fit into a drop ceiling grid.

 Surface-mounted light – the finished housing is exposed, not flush with the surface.
 Chandelier
 Pendant light – suspended from the ceiling with a chain or pipe.
 Sconce – provide up or down lights; can be used to illuminate artwork, architectural details; commonly used in hallways or as an alternative to overhead lighting.
 Track lighting fixture – individual fixtures ("track heads") can be positioned anywhere along the track, which provides electric power.
 Under-cabinet light – mounted below kitchen wall cabinets.
 Display Case or Showcase light – shows merchandise on display within an enclosed case such as jewelry, grocery stores, and chain stores.
 Ceiling fan – may sometimes have a light, often referred to as a light kit mounted to it. These light kits may be used to replace any ceiling-mounted light fixtures that were displaced by the installation of the ceiling fan.
 Emergency lighting or exit sign – connected to a battery backup or to an electric circuit that has emergency power if the mains power fails.
 High- and low-bay lighting – typically used for general lighting for industrial buildings and often big-box stores.
 Strip lights or Industrial lighting – often long lines of fluorescent lamps used in a warehouse or factory.

 Outdoor lighting and landscape lighting – used to illuminate walkways, parking lots, roadways, building exteriors and architectural details, gardens, and parks. Outdoor light fixtures can also include forms similar to indoor lighting, such as pendants, flush or close-to-ceiling light fixtures, wall-mounted lanterns and dome lights.
 High-mast, usually pole – or stanchion-mounted – for landscape, roadways, and parking lots.
 Bollard – a type of architectural outdoor lighting that is a short, upright ground-mounted unit typically used to provide cutoff type illumination for egress lighting, to light walkways, steps, or other pathways.
 Solar lamp
 Street light
 Yard light

Special-purpose lights
 Accent light – any directional light that highlights an object or attracts attention to a particular area.
 Background light – for use in video production.
 Blacklight
 Christmas lights – also called fairy lights or twinkle lights and are often used at Christmas and other holidays for decoration.
 Dock light - provides light for boating safety. Typically affixed atop pilings or directly upon the dock floor itself.
 Emergency light – provides minimal light to a building during a power outage.
 Exit sign
 Flood light
 Safelight (for use in a darkroom)
 Safety lamp (for use in coal mines)
 Searchlight (for military and advertising use)
 Security lighting
 Step light
 Strobe light
 Task light
 Traffic light
 Theatrical
Stage lighting instrument
Intelligent lighting
Followspot
 Wallwasher

Lamp types

Arc lamps
Xenon arc lamp, Yablochkov candle
 Fluorescent
Fluorescent lamp, compact fluorescent lamp (CFL), Induction lamp, blacklight.
Fuel lamps
Betty lamp, butter lamp, carbide lamp, gas lighting, kerosene lamp, oil lamp, rush light, torch, candle, Limelight, gas mantle
Safety lamps: Davy lamp and Geordie lamp
Gas-discharge lamp and high-intensity discharge lamp (HID)
Mercury-vapor lamp, Metal-halide (HMI, HQI, CDM), Sodium vapor or "high-pressure sodium"
Neon sign
 Incandescent lamp
A-lamp, Parabolic aluminized reflector lamp (PAR), reflector lamp (R), bulged reflector lamp (BR) (refer to lamp shapes)
Obsolete types: limelight, carbon button lamp, Mazda (light bulb), Nernst glower
Novelty: Lava lamp
Special purpose: heat lamp, Globar, gas mantle
Halogen – special class of incandescent lamps
Nuclear: self-powered lighting
Plasma lamp
LED (solid-state lighting)

Light-fixture controls
There are various types of devices used to manage the amount of light used:
 3-way 2-circuit switch
 Dimmer (this allows the user to make a light brighter or dimmer, typically using a rotary dial)
 Light switch (often part of the light socket or power cord on portable fixtures)
 Lighting control system
 Motion detector
 Timer
 Touch
 X10 systems

See also
 Architectural lighting design
 Coefficient of utilization
 Flashlight
 History of street lighting in the United States
 Lantern
 Lightbulb socket
 Lighting designer for the theater
 Luminous efficacy
 Timeline of lighting technology
 Light pollution

References

External links

 Look at the Chart and Pick Out the Reflector You Need, Popular Science, February 1919, page 75, Google Books

 
Electrical systems